Boris Nikolayevich Chicherin ( 1828 –  1904) was a Russian jurist and political philosopher, who worked out a theory that Russia needed a strong, authoritative government to persevere with liberal reforms. By the time of the Russian Revolution, Chicherin was probably the most reputable legal philosopher and historian in Russia.

Biography
Chicherin was born in Tambov, where his noble ancestors had been residing for many centuries. In 1849, he matriculated from the law department of the Moscow University. On insistence of Dr. Timofey Granovsky, he continued to work in the university as a professor of Russian law. Together with his friend Konstantin Kavelin, he penned a comprehensive program of Russian liberalism which was published by Alexander Herzen in London.

Chicherin was a great champion of Alexander II's reforms of the 1860s, hailing them as "the best monument of Russian legislation". He said the tsar had been:
called upon to execute one of the hardest tasks which can confront an autocratic ruler: to completely remodel the enormous state which had been entrusted to his care, to abolish an age-old order founded on slavery, to replace it with civic decency and freedom, to establish justice in a country which it never known the meaning of legality, to redesign the entire administration, to introduce freedom of the press in the context of untrammeled authority, to call new forces to life at every turn and set them on firm legal foundations, to put a repressed and humiliated society on its feet and to give at the chance to flex its muscles.

Chicherin published the Regional Administration of 17th-century Russia in 1856, followed by the treatise On Popular Representation 10 years later. Chicherin's mature works, imbued with Hegel's thought as they were, advocated the constitutional monarchy as an ideal form of government for Russia.

In 1868, Chicherin resigned his position at the university as a protest against government repressions and settled in his estate near Tambov. It was here that he wrote several volumes of his bulky History of Political Theories. Its magnificent literary style was acclaimed by such masters as Ivan Turgenev and Leo Tolstoy.

Later, Chicherin returned to Moscow, where he was elected the city mayor in 1882. At that period, he supported Alexander's harsh measures in Poland and the tsar's struggle against radical revolutionaries. His speech at Alexander III's coronation in the Kremlin was interpreted as too liberal, however, and he was forced to resign. He spent his last years writing 4 volumes of memoirs and some books on chemistry, zoology, and geometry.
The memoirs have been reprinted by Oriental Research Partners (Newtonville, MA) in 1974 with a new introduction on Chicherin's life by Prof. D. Hammer, Indiana University.

The revolutionary Georgy Chicherin, later Soviet Foreign Minister, was Boris Chicherin's nephew.

See also
List of Russian legal historians

References
Hamburg, G. M. Boris Chicherin and Early Russian Liberalism, 1828–1866 (Stanford: Stanford Univ. Press, 1992).

External links

 Extensive entry in the Brockhaus-Efron Encyclopaedia

References

1828 births
1904 deaths
Historians from the Russian Empire
Philosophers from the Russian Empire
Politicians of the Russian Empire
Imperial Moscow University alumni
Legal historians
Liberals from the Russian Empire
Mayors of Moscow